The Negros scops owl (Otus nigrorum), also known as the Visayan scops owl, is an owl, endemic to the islands of Negros and Panay in the Philippines, belonging to the family of the typical owls Strigidae. It was formerly classified as a subspecies of the Philippine scops owl. It is threatened by habitat loss and hunting for the pet trade.

Description 
EBird describes the bird as "A fairly small owl of lowland and foothill forest on the islands of Negros and Panay, where it is the only scops-owl. Dark brown above and pale gray below, with a rufous face bordered with a black line and a pale gray V-shape between the eyes. Occurs together with Luzon boobook, but Negros Scops-Owl has orange rather than yellow eyes and lacks the brown-streaked chest. Song is a descending series of upslurred yelps."

It is the smallest and palest of the endemic Philippine scops owl complex.

Negros scops owls prey at night on insects. They live alone or in monogamous pairs. They breed throughout the year, laying clutches of 1 or 2 eggs.  They nest in tree hollows in forests of the Philippine lowlands.

Habitat and conservation status 
Its natural habitats are tropical moist lowland and montane primary and secondary forest up to 1,000 meters above sea level. While they can tolerate secondary forest, they have the highest population densities and health in primary (old-growth) forest.

The IUCN Red List has assessed this bird as vulnerable with the population being estimated at 1,000 to 2,499 mature individuals. Its main threat is habitat destruction through both legal and Illegal logging, conversion into farmlands through slash-and-burn, charcoal burning, and mining. Habitat loss on both Negros and Panay has been extensive. By 2007, Negros and Panay had a 3% and 6% remaining forest cover with a huge chunk of this being in higher elevation forests where this bird does not thrive. Despite the already paltry numbers, these figures are still continuing to decline due to the above-mentioned threats.

There are currently no species-specific conservation plans. It occurs in a few protected areas in Northern Negros Natural Park, Mount Kanlaon National Park and Northwest Panay Peninsula Natural Park. However, as with most areas in the Philippines, protection from hunting and illegal logging is lax.

References

Dickinson, E.C., R.S. Kennedy, and K.C. Parkes. 1991. The birds of the Philippines. An annotated check-list. British Ornithologists' Union Check-list number 12. British Ornithologists' Union, London.

Negros scops owl
Endemic birds of the Philippines
Birds of Negros Island
Negros scops owl
Negros scops owl